Toyosi Akerele-Ogunsiji (born Oluwatoyosi Akerele, 8 November 1983) is a Nigerian social entrepreneur and human development expert whose work cuts across entrepreneurship, education, youth development and public leadership. She is the founder and chief executive officer of Rise Networks, a Nigeria-based private and public sector funded Youth Interest social enterprise.

Early life and education
Akerele-Ogunsiji was born to the family of James Ayodele and Felicia Mopelola Akerele in Lagos State, Nigeria. She attended Ebun Oluwa Nursery and Primary School, Oregun Lagos from where she headed to Lagos State Model College Kankon Badagry, Lagos for her Junior Secondary Education from 1994 to 1996 before proceeding to Egbado College (now Yewa College) from 1998 till June 2000 for her Senior Secondary Education where she graduated as the best Student in the Essay Competition organised by the Aionian Group of Schools in Ogun State. She obtained a Second Class Upper Degree in Civil Law from the University of Jos in April 2007. Akerele-Ogunsiji is A Mason Fellow and Mid Career Master in Public Administration alumnus of the Harvard University Kennedy School of Government.

She studied Strategic Management at Executive Level at Cambridge University’s Judge Business School, obtained a Certificate in Youth Inclusive Financial Services from University of New Hampshire, Durham, United States, holds a Certificate in Media Enterprise from the School of Media and Communication, Pan Atlantic University and an Executive Masters’ Certificate in Project Management from The Project Management College, UK. She has also studied Digital Marketing Strategy at the UK Institute of Digital Marketing.

Professional career
Akerele-Ogunsiji started her career in 2007 as a Corporate Communications and External Affairs Executive at Oando Oil and Gas PLC. She moved on to the Ministry of Youths and Social Development, Ogun State, Nigeria where she was the Special Assistant to the Honourable Commissioner on Youth Development before going on to establish Rise Human And Education Development Networks, an organisation that focuses on creating intellectual development and capacity building programs for young Nigerians between 16 and 30.

Akerele-Ogunsiji founded Passnownow in 2012 with the aim of helping indigent and deprived secondary school children to access and use Curriculum Compliant Education Content, from the comfort of Mobile Devices. She also founded, Printmagicng, a Printing firm that delivers 24 hours Printing Service at low cost to Small Businesses via the Internet.

in 2017, Akerele-Ogunsiji led international students of the Harvard Kennedy School of Government and Massachusetts Institute of Technology (MIT) to a one-week Public Sector and Innovation Field Trip in, Lagos, Nigeria. The trip was described as providing "a veritable platform for Engagement for Harvard Students and Faculty to learn more about Urban Development and Innovation, Economic Competitiveness, Democratic Governance and emerging Trends in the Public Policies of Lagos and Nigeria."

Family 
In 2014, she married Adekunle Ogunsiji, an ICT professional, in a low key wedding at her family house in Ikeja, Lagos.

Publications
Akerele-Ogunsiji had several papers and publications on leadership, youth and business development, including authoring:

 Strate-Tricks: strategies and tricks, the winning formula for emerging businesses 
 We Have to Belong: Why the Poor Majority of my Rich Country cannot wait anymore which was launched at the Center for Public Leadership, Harvard Kennedy School in May 2017.

Her writings and interviews have been published in The Nation, the Nigerian Guardian, The Punch and This Day newspapers.

Awards, appointments and recognition
 Selected as one of 101 Young African Leaders by the African Business Forum in 2007
 Alumni of the Prestigious International Visitor Leadership Program of the United States Government
 Recognition by Crans Montana Forum in Europe as a New Leader of Tomorrow 
 Recipient of This Day Awards for Nigeria's Women of Distinction 
 Young Entrepreneur of the Year 2011 of Success Digest Entrepreneurial Awards 
 Recipient of the 2011 Excellence Awards of the School of Media and Communication, Pan African University
 Recipient of the 2008 Future Africa Awards Best Use of Advocacy Category and the Nigerian Youth Leadership Awards jointly organized by Leap Africa, International Youth Foundation and NOKIA.
 One of the honorees’ of the Top 100 Young Leaders’ Recognition at the Nigeria's Centenary Celebrations by the Federal Government
 Honoured by 234 GIVE, a Social Initiative that encourages Nigerians to donate to the adopted Charities and improve livelihoods for the less privileged 
 In May 2010, Toyosi was selected for the Nigeria Leadership Initiative's Future Leaders Fellowship. NLI is a member of the Aspen Global Leadership Network.
 Member of The Right to Know Initiative, a Nonprofit focused on Human Rights and Open Data Issues and their social impact on Citizens in 2011 * Appointed the Youngest Member of the Victims of Terrorism Funds Committee.
 Jury Member of the Get Started Africa Entrepreneurship Challenge initiated by NESCAFÉ to empower Youth across the Continent
 Member and a Mentor of the African Entrepreneurship Awards & a Mentor on the Bank of Africa's Africa Entrepreneurship Awards 
 Named on the 2015 Honours List of Genevieve Magazine's Top 21 most Outstanding Nigerian Women and in 2016 as one of Nigeria's youngest achievers under 35.

She has delivered Papers and presentations as well as led focused group discussions at the Nigerian Economic Summit Group, Women in Management, Business and Public Sector, Youth Africamp organized annually by Open Society Institute of East Africa, Women of West African Entrepreneurship, Africa Wide Consultation on Post 2015 Development Agenda and Expert Group Meeting, and the United Nations Media Workshop on Africa Governance Report.

Akerele-Ogunsiji was in June 2011 described by Michelle Obama, then First Lady of the United States, as one of her personal inspirations in a televised address to America as a prelude to her arrival in Africa for the Young African Women Leaders Forum of which Akerele-Ogunsiji remains the only Nigerian member to date. In 2014, Forbes named Akerele-Ogunsiji as one of the 20 most Powerful Young Women in Africa. In the same year, she was also nominated for the MTV Africa Music Awards.

See also
Ade Olufeko
Obi Asika
Ade Hassan

References

External links

1983 births
Living people
21st-century Nigerian businesswomen
21st-century Nigerian businesspeople
Businesspeople from Lagos
University of Jos alumni
Harvard Kennedy School alumni
Nigerian social entrepreneurs
Mason Fellows